James Gossland (born 6 September 1860 in Glasgow) was a Scottish footballer, who played for Dennistoun, Alexandra Athletic, Rangers and the Scotland national team.

After spells at Dennistoun and Alexandra Athletic, the latter for whom he also served as general secretary, he joined Rangers in 1882. During his time at Rangers, he won his only cap for Scotland, and scored twice in 5–0 win over Ireland on 26 January 1884. In 1885, he was appointed as Rangers' match secretary and continued to feature intermittently in the first team until 1889. He had the honour of being the first person to score in the British Home Championship.

Gossland died in East Transvaal, South Africa, around November 1944.

References

External links
 

1860 births
1944 deaths
Scottish footballers
Scotland international footballers
Rangers F.C. players
Rangers F.C. non-playing staff
Association football forwards
Footballers from Glasgow
Date of death missing
Scottish expatriates in South Africa
Scottish football managers